The 2021–22 season was the 102nd season of Al Masry SC. The team are participating in the Egyptian Premier League and Egypt Cup, the domestic cup.

Players

Transfers

Pre-season and friendlies

Competitions

Overall record

Premier League

League table

Results summary

Results by round

Matches 
The league fixtures were announced on 12 October 2021.

Egypt Cup

CAF Confederation Cup

Second round

Play-off round

Group stage 

The draw for the group stage was held on 28 December 2021.

Knockout stage

Quarter-finals

References 

Al Masry SC seasons
Egyptian football clubs 2021–22 season